{{DISPLAYTITLE:L-gulonolactone oxidase}}

L-Gulonolactone oxidase (EC 1.1.3.8) is an enzyme that produces vitamin C, but is non-functional in Haplorrhini (including humans), in some bats, and in guinea pigs. It catalyzes the reaction of L-gulono-1,4-lactone with oxygen to form L-xylo-hex-3-gulonolactone (2-keto-gulono-γ-lactone) and hydrogen peroxide. It uses FAD as a cofactor. The L-xylo-hex-3-gulonolactone then converts to ascorbic acid spontaneously, without enzymatic action.

Gulonolactone oxidase deficiency
The non-functional gulonolactone oxidase pseudogene (GULOP) was mapped to human chromosome 8p21, which corresponds to an evolutionarily conserved segment on either porcine chromosome 4 (SSC4) or 14 (SSC14). GULO produces the precursor to ascorbic acid, which spontaneously converts to the vitamin itself.

The loss of activity of the gene encoding L-gulonolactone oxidase (GULO) has occurred separately in the history of several species. GULO activity has been lost in some species of bats, but others retain it. The loss of this enzyme activity is responsible for the inability of guinea pigs to enzymatically synthesize vitamin C. Both these events happened independently of the loss in the haplorrhine suborder of primates, which includes humans.

The remnant of this non-functional gene with many mutations is still present in the genomes of guinea pigs and humans. It is unknown if remains of the gene exist in the bats who lack GULO activity. The function of GULO appears to have been lost several times, and possibly re-acquired, in several lines of passerine birds, where ability to make vitamin C varies from species to species.

Loss of GULO activity in the primate order occurred about 63 million years ago, at about the time it split into the suborders Haplorhini (which lost the enzyme activity) and Strepsirrhini (which retained it). The haplorhine ("simple-nosed") primates, which cannot make vitamin C enzymatically, include the tarsiers and the simians (apes, monkeys and humans). The strepsirrhine ("bent-nosed" or "wet-nosed") primates, which can still make vitamin C enzymatically, include lorises, galagos, pottos, and, to some extent, lemurs.

L-Gulonolactone oxidase deficiency has been called "hypoascorbemia" and is described by OMIM (Online Mendelian Inheritance in Man) as "a public inborn error of metabolism", as it affects all humans. There exists a wide discrepancy between the amounts of ascorbic acid other primates consume and what are recommended as "reference intakes" for humans. In its patently pathological form, the effects of ascorbate deficiency are manifested as scurvy.

Consequences of loss
It is likely that some level of adaptation occurred after the loss of the GULO gene by primates. Erythrocyte Glut1 and associated dehydroascorbic acid uptake modulated by stomatin switch are unique traits of humans and the few other mammals that have lost the ability to synthesize ascorbic acid from glucose. As GLUT transporters and stomatin are ubiquitously distributed in different human cell types and tissues, similar interactions may occur in human cells other than erythrocytes.

Linus Pauling observed that after the loss of endogenous ascorbate production, apo(a) and Lp(a)  were greatly favored by evolution, acting as ascorbate surrogate, since the frequency of occurrence of elevated Lp(a) plasma levels in species that had lost the ability to synthesize ascorbate is great. Also, only primates share regulation of CAMP gene expression by vitamin D, which occurred after the loss of GULO gene.

Johnson et al. have hypothesized that the mutation of the GULOP pseudogene so that it stopped producing GULO may have been of benefit to early primates by increasing uric acid levels and enhancing fructose effects on weight gain and fat accumulation. With a shortage of food supplies this gave mutants a survival advantage.

Animal models 
Studies of human diseases have benefited from the availability of small laboratory animal models. However, the tissues of animal models with a GULO gene generally have high levels of ascorbic acid and so are often only slightly influenced by exogenous vitamin C. This is a major handicap for studies involving the endogenous redox systems of primates and other animals that lack this gene.

Guinea pigs are a popular human model. They lost the ability to make GULO 20 million years ago.

In 1999, Maeda et al. genetically engineered mice with inactivated GULO gene. The mutant mice, like humans, entirely depend on dietary vitamin C, and they show changes indicating that the integrity of their vasculature is compromised. GULO–/– mice have been used as a human model in multiple subsequent studies.

There have been successful attempts to activate lost enzymatic function in different animal species.   Various GULO mutants were also identified.

Plant models 
In plants, the importance of vitamin C in regulating whole plant morphology, cell structure, and plant development has been clearly established via characterization of low vitamin C mutants of Arabidopsis thaliana, potato, tobacco, tomato, and rice. Elevating vitamin C content by overexpressing inositol oxygenase and gulono-1,4-lactone oxidase in A. thaliana leads to enhanced biomass and tolerance to abiotic stresses.

Alternative substrates and related enzymes 
GULO belongs to a family of sugar-1,4-lactone oxidases, which also contains the yeast enzyme D-arabinono-1,4-lactone oxidase (ALO). ALO produces erythorbic acid when acting on its canonical substrate. This family is in turn a subfamily under more sugar-1,4-lactone oxidases, which also includes the bacterial L-gulono-1,4-lactone dehydrogenase and the plant galactonolactone dehydrogenase. All these aldonolactone oxidoreductases play a role in some form of vitamin C synthesis, and some (including GULO and ALO) accept substrates of other members.

See also 
 Vitamin C (ascorbic acid)
 Oxidoreductase
 Scurvy

References

Further reading 

 
 
 
 

EC 1.1.3
Pseudogenes